The Chief of the Guatemalan General Staff is the professional head of the Armed Forces of Guatemala. He is  responsible for the administration and the operational control of the Guatemalan military. It is the highest rank military position in the country.

List of officeholders

General Staff (14 November 1890–12 June 1930)
 ?

Army Staff (12 June 1930–5 September 1968)
 ?

General Staff of the Army (5 September 1968–23 March 1983)

National Defense Staff (23 March 1983–present)

References

Military of Guatemala
Guatemala